The "School Level Certificate"  popularly abbreviated as SLC, is the final examination of Class 11 and Class 12 which is also known as +2 course in Nepal. +2 is generally pursued after completing SEE examination (Class 10 Final Exam).+2 Course is equivalent to GCE also known as school leaving qualification and SEE is equivalent to GCSE, the academic qualifications in England.

Until 2016, SLC was known as Grade 10 final examination. However, after 2016 it was replaced and renamed as SEE examination. Every student must take SEE examination(according to the new Education Act) before they join higher secondary or intermediate level education (Class 11th and 12th grade also known as +2 Course). The SLC (Class 11 and 12) and SEE (Class 10) examination is normally scheduled in April to June of every year. Class 10, 11 and 12 examinations are held by National Examination Board(NEB) located in Sanothimi, Bhaktapur, Nepal.Class 10 was known as the "iron gate" in Nepal. In reality, however, there are indeed more obstacles regarding higher-level studies (SLC aka +2) after the examination. The SLC Examinations are the most important examination in the educational system of Nepal for building an academic career. The government has a great determination that the grading system that has been recently implemented in the SEE examination will help the country to increase the literacy rate. As the new Education Act, 2016 (2073) has been implemented. The SEE examination will take place in Grade 10 as a national level examination, whereas the examination of Grade 10 will be known as Secondary Education Examination (S.E.E).

Examination centres
For most of the years, when the SLC Board was in execution, Nepal used to be divided into five development regions and seventy-five districts, and each region had many examination centers (as per the Examination Commission's Plan). The examination questions used to differ from region to region but were the same within one single region, so if the exam were to be canceled, only one region would be affected, and only the questions of that region would have to be prepared. Every examination takes place at the same time throughout the whole country. There are different centers for students belonging to different schools.

Results
About two and a half to three months after the completion of the SLC now called SEE, the SEE results are published by the Examination Control Board. Students are categorized into five divisions according to their score:

Despite such a low percentage required to pass the examination, many students (more than 50%), mostly students of government schools in rural areas of Nepal, still fail the exam every year due to its level of difficulty. Since government schools are known for being less rigorous to students compared to private schools,  government school students are reportedly less likely to pass the exam. Even if one fails to get above 40 marks in each subject, they are declared failed. The result of the SLC is significant to an individual student since students with a high percentage can obtain various scholarships for their higher secondary level education.

The Government Of Nepal has now formulated and implemented a new system for SLC. The Government has changed the system that has proven quite advantageous and disadvantageous in its implementing year. The students do not fail in the exam according to the new system, but those having low GPI don't get admission for higher-level studies. That's why the education system has been getting a lot of criticism.

Criticism
Some educationalists in Nepal criticize the SLC exam by citing it not being important so they have been replaced by SEE in the present context. They say that the tests are neither standardized nor can it assess the capacity of Nepalese children. The education experts, for the past three decades, have been asking the government to review and revise the SLC examinations. However, the government, they say, is running the same old mechanism that will still be running in the same way for several decades more. And also there is no trend of SLC examination results in a continuum, rather it is so haphazard that the School Leaving Certificate results can not be trusted, they say.

In 2010, mathematics question paper was leaked in Bajang, Kailali, Sunsari, Bara and Banke districts as well. A huge criticism arises on the SEE Administrators after the question of SEE 2019 of Province No. 2 get leaked before the exam day. The government postponed and even retook the previous day exam. They believed that it get spammed and went viral through different social sites and free video calling application like IMO. The SEE Security Committee chaired by Education Minister Giriraj Mani Pokharel took a decision and handed the case to CIB.

References

Education in Nepal